The transparent blue-eye (Pseudomugil pellucidus) is a species of fish in the subfamily Pseudomugilinae.

References

Fish of New Guinea
Pseudomugil
Taxa named by Gerald R. Allen 
Taxa named by Walter Ivantsoff
Fish described in 1998